The Suffolk University Law Review is a law review published at Suffolk University Law School in Boston, Massachusetts by an independent student group.

Overview
The law review's membership consists entirely of second and third year law students at Suffolk University Law School. These students are selected from an annual writing competition, and eligibility to compete is based on exceptional first-year grades. Suffolk University Law Review was established in 1967 and publishes all of its articles in both print form and online.

Donahue Lecture Series
The Suffolk University Law Review sponsors the Donahue Lecture Series, which annually attracts lecturers from among the nation's top legal scholars and jurists. Each Donahue Lecturer is an exceptionally prominent legal scholar who delivers a lecture at Suffolk University Law School that forms the basis for a Lead Article to be published in the Law Review shortly thereafter.

The Law Review instituted this lecture series in 1980 to commemorate the Honorable Frank J. Donahue, former faculty member, trustee, and treasurer of Suffolk University. Judge Donahue graduated from Suffolk University Law School in 1921, and served as an Associate Justice of the Superior Court of Massachusetts for forty-two years—the longest term in that court's history. As Chairman of the Law School Committee of the Board of Trustees, Judge Donahue played an active role in the expansion of the faculty, library, and other facilities at the law school. For many years, he served as president of the Law School Alumni Association, and in that capacity personally raised thousands of dollars of scholarship funds to promote, encourage, and reward the pursuit of scholastic excellence.

Over the years, the Donahue Lecture Series has featured a number of outstanding legal scholars and jurists, including: Chief Justice William Rehnquist, Associate Justices Antonin Scalia, Stephen Breyer, and Sonia Sotomayor, Judge Richard Posner, former United States Attorney General Edwin Meese, and consumer protection activist Ralph Nader.

The Following is a Representative, but Currently Incomplete List of Prior Donahue Lecturers 
 Last Update: February 22, 2013

References

External links
 

American law journals
Suffolk University Law School
Publications established in 1967
English-language journals
Quarterly journals